The Hundred of Yanyarrie is a hundred within County of Granville, South Australia.

History
It  was proclaimed on 18 January 1877 and its school opened in 1882 but closed in 1954.

"The Yanyarrie Post Office opened in June 1878 and the Yanyarrie School in 1873; the latter closed in 1954. The Yanyarrie Whim Post Office, opened in 1877 between Eurelia and Yanyarrie on the Hallett- Blinman postal line, was renamed ‘Carrieton’ in April 1888. In 1884, Messrs Burgoyne and Coglin, MP’s, presented to the Minister of Justice and Education (Hon. R.C. Baker) a request from the residents of Yanyarrie that a new school should be provided because ‘the building in which it is now carried on is most unsuitable. One of the settlers is willing to give a piece of land on section 168 for a site".

The main town of the hundred is Carrieton, South Australia which was established 1877, beyond Goyder Line.

See also
 Lands administrative divisions of South Australia

References

Yanyarrie